Ischnosiphon leucophaeus is a species of plant in the family Marantaceae. Its native range is from Nicaragua south to Brazil.

References

Flora of Central America
Flora of South America
Flora of Nicaragua
Flora of Panama
Flora of Bolivia
Flora of Brazil
Flora of Peru
Flora of Ecuador
Flora of Colombia
Flora of Venezuela
Flora of French Guiana
Flora of Suriname
Taxa named by Friedrich August Körnicke